The 2011 Western Kentucky Hilltoppers football team represented Western Kentucky University (WKU) in the 2011 NCAA Division I FBS football season. The Hilltoppers were led by second-year head coach Willie Taggart and played their home games at Houchens Industries–L. T. Smith Stadium. They are members of the Sun Belt Conference. The Hilltoppers finished with a record of 7–5, 7–1 in Sun Belt play to finish in second place. The 7 wins and second place conference finish are the Hilltoppers best results since joining the FBS. Despite being bowl eligible, the Hilltoppers were not invited to a bowl.

Schedule

References

WKU
Western Kentucky Hilltoppers football seasons
Western Kentucky Hilltoppers football